The EMD SW900 is a diesel switcher locomotive built by General Motors Electro-Motive Division and General Motors Diesel (GMD) between December 1953 and March 1969. Power was provided by an EMD 567C 8-cylinder engine that generated 900 horsepower (670 kW). Built concurrently with the SW1200, the eight-cylinder units had a single exhaust stack.

260 examples of this locomotive model were built for American railroads and 97 were built for Canadian railroads. Canadian production of the SW900 lasted three and a half years past EMD production. Seven units were exported to Orinoco Mining Co (Venezuela); two units were exported to Southern Peru Copper Co; and five units were exported to the Liberian American-Swedish Minerals Company. Total production is 371 units.

Some SW900s were built with the generators from traded in EMC Winton-engined switchers and were classified as SW900M by EMD. Units rebuilt from SW or SC model locomotives developed 600 or 660 horsepower with the older generators instead of the full 900 horsepower of the SW900.

In the early 1960s, the Reading Company sent 14 of their Baldwin VO 1000 model switchers to EMD to have them rebuilt to SW900 specifications. The Reading units retained the Baldwin switcher carbody and were rated at 1000 horsepower by EMD.

A Cow-calf variation, the TR9, was cataloged, but none were built.

Original buyers

Built by Electro-Motive Division, USA

Built by General Motors Diesel, Canada

External links

See also
List of GM-EMD locomotives
List of GMD Locomotives

References

 
 Extra 2200 South Volume 7 No.3 August September 1968 page 3
 Northern Pacific Railway Diesel Era 1945-1970

External links 
 EMD Serials
 EMD Trade In Serials
 EMD Export Serials
 GMD Serials 

B-B locomotives
SW0900
SW0900
Diesel-electric locomotives of the United States
Railway locomotives introduced in 1954
Standard gauge locomotives of the United States
Standard gauge locomotives of Canada
Standard gauge locomotives of Peru
Standard gauge locomotives of Venezuela
Diesel-electric locomotives of Canada
Diesel-electric locomotives of Peru
Diesel-electric locomotives of Venezuela

Shunting locomotives